FSP Group  (全漢企業) is a Taiwanese manufacturer of electronic power supplies.

FSP Group originally consisted of three companies, Fortron/Source Corp. (USA), Sparkle Power Intl Ltd. (Taiwan) and Powertech Systems (Taiwan). F, stands for Fortron /Source USA, S, stands for SPI and P, stands for Powertech systems.

However, around 2002, Sparkle Power International Ltd. and Powertech Systems (Taiwan) separated. Sparkle Power International Ltd. later changed its name to FSP Technology Inc. In 2007, FSP Technology Inc. (Taiwan) acquired Protek Power (Taiwan) that makes medical power supplies. Therefore, FSP Group now consists of Fortron/Source Corp. (USA), FSP Technology Inc. (Taiwan, public listed company, stock code 3015) and Protek Power (Taiwan).

FSP Group's major power supply product lines include:
 PC / Industrial Power Supplies
 ODM or OEM Power Supply 
 Open Frame
 LCD TV Power
 Medical Power Supply
 Adapters

FSP Group has global representation with branch offices in USA, Germany, France, UK, Russia, Japan, India, Korea and China.

FSP developed their own retail brand "FSP" in 2003, which mainly sells power supplies. Power supplies manufactured by FSP are also sold by Antec, Sparkle Power International (SPI) (USA), OCZ, SilverStone Technology, Thermaltake, Nexus and Zalman under their own names.

FSP also offer a wide range of retail Universal laptop adapters along with uninterruptible power supplies (UPS) and PowerBank rechargeable battery packs for charging mobile USB devices.

See also
 List of companies of Taiwan

References

External links 
 Corporate website
 Consumer website

Electronics companies established in 1993
Computer power supply unit manufacturers
Electronics companies of Taiwan
Taiwanese companies established in 1993
Computer enclosure companies